The 2010 A Championship was the third season of the A Championship in Ireland. The season was sponsored by Newstalk. The league featured 18 teams. UCD A were the champions, winning the title for a second time while Bohemians A finished as runners up.

Group 1

Teams

Final table

Results

Group 2

Teams

Final table

Results

Play-Offs

A Championship Final

Promotion/Relegation
The tenth placed team from the 2010 First Division, Salthill Devon, played the highest placed non-reserve team, Cobh Ramblers, from the 2010 A Championship. The winner of this play off would play in the 2011 First Division. 

Salthill Devon won 3 – 1 on aggregate and retained their place in the 2011 First Division

See also
 2010 A Championship Cup
 2010 League of Ireland Premier Division
 2010 League of Ireland First Division
 2010 League of Ireland Cup

References

 
3
A Championship seasons
Ireland
Ireland

fr:Championnat d'Irlande de football 2010#A Championship